The Introspection Rundown is a controversial Church of Scientology auditing process that is intended to handle a psychotic episode or complete mental breakdown.  Introspection is defined for the purpose of this rundown as a condition where the person is "looking into one's own mind, feelings, reactions, etc."  The result is "the person extroverted, no longer looking inward worriedly continuously without end."

The Introspection Rundown came under public scrutiny after the death of Lisa McPherson in 1995. The rundown was created by L. Ron Hubbard, founder of Scientology, and released 24 January 1974.

Overview
In Scientology, a rundown is a procedure set out as a series of steps to produce a particular result, or phenomenon.

Hubbard outlined the Introspection Rundown in three technical bulletins:

 HCO Bulletin 23 January 1974RB, Revised 25 April 1991: "The Technical Breakthrough of 1973! The Introspection RD"
 HCO Bulletin 20 February 1974R, Revised 25 April 1991: "Introspection RD, Additional Actions"
 HCO Bulletin 6 March 1974: "Introspection RD, Second Addition, Information to C/Ses, Fixated Attention"

The first step of the rundown is "isolate the person wholly with all attendants completely muzzled (no speech)."  Auditing sessions are given frequently, otherwise the person is not spoken to.

"When it is obvious the person is out of his psychosis and up to the responsibility of living with others his isolation is ended." To determine the end of isolation the supervisor in charge case of the person being isolated tests the person's condition by writing a note, such as "Dear Joe. What can you guarantee me if you are let out of isolation?" If Joe's answer shows continued irresponsibility, the supervisor must write back something along the lines of, "Dear Joe. I'm sorry but it is no go on coming out of isolation yet," including the reasons of why not.  When it is obvious the person is out of his psychosis and up to the responsibility of living with others his isolation is ended.

To administer this rundown a Scientologist requires an education in Scientology beliefs and practices (which are dubbed "technologies" by the Church). This education includes all of the technical bulletins (17 large volumes), all of the Scientology books (many) and hundreds of hours of recorded lectures, all of which must be understood and proficiency in them demonstrated step by step.

The technical bulletin goes on, "This Rundown is very simple but cannot be flubbed, as that will compound the errors and cause further introspection in the p/c (pre-clear/person)"   It "is very precise and even touchy business. There must be no mistakes and you cannot be heavy-handed on them."

Hubbard declared about the Introspection Rundown: "THIS MEANS THE LAST REASON TO HAVE PSYCHIATRY AROUND IS GONE", because "I have made a technical breakthrough which possibly ranks with the major discoveries of the Twentieth Century." "Its results are nothing short of miraculous."

Lisa McPherson controversy

Scientology adherent Lisa McPherson had a car accident in Clearwater, Florida on 18 November 1995, while studying at Scientology headquarters. She disrobed by the side of the road, in front of the paramedics who were there for a routine traffic accident report. She was taken to a hospital for a psychiatric evaluation, but some Scientologists arrived and stated that McPherson did not believe in psychiatry, and she checked out after a short evaluation and left with the Scientologists.

McPherson was put on the Introspection Rundown after her accident on 18 November. It was her second time on the rundown, her first time having been in June. Her appearance after death was that of someone who had been denied water and food for quite some time, being both underweight and severely dehydrated. Additionally, her skin was covered with over a hundred insect bites, presumably from cockroaches. She was locked in a room for 17 days. The Church has repeatedly denied any wrongdoing, and now makes members sign a waiver before Introspection Rundown specifically stating that they (or anyone on their behalf) will not bring any legal action against the organization over injury or death.

See also
 List of Scientology Rundowns
Scientology in the United States

References

External links
 The Introspection Rundown (Jeff Jacobsen)
The Lisa McPherson Clause: Scientology Moving to Secure Its 'Right' to Kill Again (David S. Touretzky)

Scientology beliefs and practices
Scientology rundowns